Florence-Marie Cooper (February 9, 1940 – January 15, 2010) was a United States district judge of the United States District Court for the Central District of California.

Early life and education

Cooper was born in Vancouver, British Columbia, Canada and moved to San Francisco, California with her family in 1952. Cooper graduated from high school in 1958 and began working as a legal secretary. She attended night classes at City College of San Francisco for five years, but did not graduate from the school. In 1971, her husband's job was transferred to Los Angeles, and Cooper began attending Beverly Law School under a program for students who had not graduated from college. During that time, Beverly Law School merged into Whittier College School of Law, from which Cooper received her Juris Doctor in 1975 as the top student in her class.

Legal and academic career

Cooper served as law clerk for Judge Arthur Alarcon, Los Angeles Superior Court, Appellate Department (1975–1977). She served as deputy city attorney of Los Angeles, California (1977). She was senior research attorney for Judge Arthur Alarcon, Second Appellate District, California Court of Appeal (1978–1980). She was a senior research attorney for Judge Woods, Second Appellate District, California Court of Appeal (1980–1983). She was an adjunct professor at San Fernando Valley College School of Law (1980–1985).

Judicial career

State judicial service
Cooper was court commissioner of the Los Angeles Superior Court from 1983 to 1990. She then served as a judge of Los Angeles Municipal Court from 1990 to 1991 and of the Los Angeles Superior Court from 1991 to 1999.

Federal judicial service
She was nominated by President Bill Clinton on July 14, 1999, to a seat vacated by Linda H. McLaughlin on the United States District Court for the Central District of California. She was confirmed by the United States Senate on November 10, 1999, and received her commission on November 15, 1999. She served as a United States district judge until her death of lymphoma on January 15, 2010, aged 69.

In popular culture

Cooper is portrayed briefly by actress Elizabeth McGovern in the 2015 feature film Woman in Gold.

See also
 List of Jewish American jurists

References

External links

1940 births
2010 deaths
20th-century American judges
20th-century American women judges
21st-century American judges
21st-century American women judges
Canadian emigrants to the United States
California state court judges
Deaths from cancer in California
Deaths from lymphoma
Judges of the United States District Court for the Central District of California
People from Santa Monica, California
People from Vancouver
Superior court judges in the United States
United States district court judges appointed by Bill Clinton
Whittier Law School alumni